Auburn is a Western Sydney suburb in the state of New South Wales, Australia.
The suburb was named after Oliver Goldsmith's poem The Deserted Village, which describes 'Auburn' in England as the "loveliest village of the plain".

Auburn prides itself as one of the most multicultural communities in Australia, being home to a high percentage of immigrants from Afghan, Turkish, Lebanese, and Chinese backgrounds.

History

Origins

The Auburn area was once used by Aboriginal people as a market place for the exchange of goods, a site for ritual battles and a 'Law Place' for ceremonies. The area was located on the border between the Darug inland group and the Eora/Dharawal coastal group. The Wangal and Wategoro, sub-groups or clans, are the groups most often recognised as the original inhabitants of the Auburn/Homebush Bay region.

Bennelong, one of the most famous Natives of the time, was a member of Wangal, as was his wife, Barangaroo. Pemulwuy, who organised tribes to resist the white settlement of the Sydney region from 1790 to 1802 was also a member of the Wangal.

On 5 February 1788, soon after the landing of Captain Phillip at Sydney Cove, Captain John Hunter and Lieutenant William Bradley sailed up what is now known as the Parramatta River, as far as Homebush Bay. Captain Hunter was the first European to set foot within the Auburn Local Government Area. Ten days later, the Governor, along with a well-armed party in three boats, reached Homebush Bay. The following day a party of explorers traced the river in a westerly direction, coming to the place where the Duck River enters the Parramatta River. They explored the tributary as far as the depth of water permitted. Seeing what appeared to be ducks rising out of a swamp covered with reeds, they named the river Duck River. The ducks were actually Eastern Swamp Hens, but the name Duck River remained. The Eastern Swamp Hen featured prominently on the council's Coat of Arms and was part of the former Auburn City Council logo.

Settlement
In February 1793, Auburn area was established as the first free-agricultural settlement thanks to Governor Phillip's repeated applications to the British government for free settlers. Phillip was of the opinion that only free settlers with the assistance of convicts will be able to create an environment in which a country could support its inhabitants. Secretary Dundas endorsed Governor's opinion and secured an agreement with several farmers, some of whom were members of the Religious Society of Friends (Quakers), to settle in the colony. The first grants were given to Thomas Rose, Frederic Meredith, Thomas and Joseph Webb as well as Edward Powell. The deeds of the land described the farms' location as Liberty Plains and this is the name given to the neighbourhood of their farms by the first settlers, although the actual area bearing that name was a little further, lying at the upper part of Port Jackson. Dwellers of the Liberty Plains Parish were very proud of the fact that in the colony of felons they were the first people who came to Australia as free men and were given a privilege of choosing their own grants. This proud heritage is reflected in the motto on the Auburn coat of arms: "Liberty, with steady zeal".

In the late 1870s a "township" was surveyed "in the centre of the Liberty Plains… 11 miles from Sydney, on the Suburban Railway line" and divided into "fine township allotments all fronting grand wide streets". The subdivision was named 'Auburn', being a reference to Goldsmith's poem 'The Deserted Village'.  The poem begins: "Sweet Auburn! Loveliest village of the plain".  Advertisements for the sale of allotments in May 1878 quoted the poem and added: "So wrote the poet in years gone by in describing the 'Auburn' of Old England, and fitly does it describe the new Auburn of the Sunny South".

One of the early settlers in the area was Fred Chisholm, who had an estate west of the present site of Auburn railway station. In the 1880s, John Buchanan, a timber merchant, purchased land from Fred Chisholm and built his home, 'Duncraggarn Hall', a two-storey Italianate mansion with a central tower and elaborate wrought-iron balconies. In 1892, Buchanan sold his thirteen-acre estate to the Sisters of Charity, who turned the house into St Joseph's Hospital for Consumptives. In 1903, extensions to the hospital were constructed and the house itself became a convent for the sisters. Further modifications and extensions took place over the years, with the eventual result that the old hospital site became St Joseph's Village—a retirement village—with a modern hospital next door. 'Duncraggarn Hall' is heritage-listed.

Auburn council
The formal Auburn Local Government Area was formed in 1948, when Auburn and Lidcombe Councils merged into Auburn Municipal Council. In 2006 it became the City of Auburn which in 2016 was split between other local government areas.

20th century and immigration
In the late 20th century, Auburn became a popular point of settlement for successive waves of immigrants. In the post-World War II era, immigrants from the Ukraine, Russia, Italy and Greece settled in Auburn, who were succeeded in the 1960s by immigrants from Turkey and Vietnam. More recently, a large number of immigrants have settled in Auburn from China and Afghanistan. The history of immigrant settlement in Auburn has resulted in a suburb which is noted for its multicultural environment.

Heritage listings 
Auburn has a number of heritage-listed sites, including:
 Great Southern and Western railway: Auburn Railway Signal Box
 93 Parramatta Road: Electricity Substation No. 167

Commercial area
Auburn has a mixture of residential, commercial and industrial areas. A commercial area is located close to Auburn railway station. There are many multicultural restaurants and cafes.

This reflects Auburn's history as a popular place of settlement for successive waves of immigrants in Sydney. It is a focal point especially for significant events such as football matches or political developments in the Middle East.

Some distance north of the town centre clustered around the railway station, commercial and industrial developments are also located along the length of Parramatta Road and surrounding streets.

It is home to the LFL team Auburn Wildcats who play in the Australian Eastern Conference as it is one of 6 teams in Sydney who represent this league. There are 40 teams in total of the LFL Australia and 12 are located in NSW.

Transport services

Rail 
Auburn railway station is on the Western and Inner West & Leppington lines of the Sydney Trains network, where there are frequent services.

The Auburn Maintenance Centre, a large maintenance and storage facility which services Sydney Trains rolling stock, is located to the northwest of the town centre, close to Clyde station.

Bus 
Auburn also has a number of bus services, which service Auburn and the surrounding areas.

Busways operate two routes to and from Auburn station:
540: to Silverwater Correctional Complex
544: to Macquarie Centre

Transdev NSW operates four routes via Auburn station:
908: Merrylands to Bankstown
909: Parramatta to Bankstown
911: to Bankstown
S3: to Auburn Botanical Gardens

Auburn railway station is served by two NightRide routes:
N60: Fairfield station to Town Hall station
N61: Carlingford station to Town Hall station

Landmarks
 Auburn Hospital with basic 24-hour emergency facilities is on Norval and Hargrave Streets.
 Auburn Botanical Gardens

Schools

 Al-Faisal College
Alpha Omega Senior College
Auburn Girls High School
Auburn North Public School
Auburn West Public School
Auburn Public School
 Amity College (Auburn Campus)
St John of God Primary school
St Joseph The Worker Primary School
 Trinity Catholic College
 Sydney Adventist College, Auburn Campus

Religious structures

The Auburn Baptist Church opened in 1888 and since 1928 has resided at its present location on Harrow Road.

The Sri Mandir in Auburn is Australia's oldest Hindu temple, having opened in 1977.

The Auburn Gallipoli Mosque took thirteen years to construct and was largely funded by the Turkish community in the area. The name of the mosque reflects the legacy of Gallipoli in Turkey and the shared bond between Australian society and the Australian Turkish Muslim Community who constructed the mosque.

Population

Demographics
According to the 2016 census of population, there were 37,366 residents in Auburn.  29.5% of people were born in Australia. The most common other countries of birth were China 12.7%, Nepal 6.5%, Afghanistan 6.1%, Pakistan 5.5% and India 5.0%. 12.9% of people only spoke English at home. Other languages spoken at home included Arabic 13.3%, Mandarin 12.0%, Turkish 8.4%, Cantonese 6.8% and Nepali 6.7%. The most common responses for religious affiliation were Islam 43.0%, No Religion 15.5%, Catholic 9.7% and Hinduism 8.8%.

Notable people
 Chris Bath, television and radio journalist
 John Benaud, Australian test cricketer
 Hippolyte De La Rue, Senior RAAF Commander
 Ahmad Elrich, football (soccer)
 Tarek Elrich, football (soccer)
 Brad Fittler, former professional rugby league player, coach, and sportscaster, born in Auburn.
 Alex Gersbach, football (soccer)
 Jamal Idris, rugby league player 
 Scott Jamieson, football (soccer)
 Tomi Juric, football (soccer)
 Jack Lang, former Premier of NSW (1925–1927, 1930–1932), had a long and close association with Auburn, setting up a successful real estate business there. He went on to serve on the local council, eventually becoming Mayor. He died in Auburn in 1975
 Feleti Mateo, rugby league player 
 Salim Mehajer, suspended deputy mayor of Auburn City Council. Attracted national infamy for his grossly exuberant wedding, criminal record, allegations of corruption and electoral fraud.
 Grant Millington, rugby league player
 John Moulton was a general surgeon in Auburn
 Warren Mundine, the first Indigenous president of the Australian Labor Party. Born in Grafton in 1956, Warren and his family lived in Auburn in the mid-1960s. 
 Lelea Paea, rugby league and rugby union player
 Lopini Paea, rugby league player
 Mickey Paea, rugby league player
 Stanley Llewellyn Perry, Lieutenant-Colonel of the 48th Battalion during World War I
 Garry Rush, racing driver
 Myuran Sukumaran (1981–2015), executed drug trafficker and co-ringleader of the Bali Nine
 Zeb Taia, rugby league player 
 Kelepi Tanginoa, rugby league player 
 Tevita Tatola, rugby league player with South Sydney Rabbitohs
 Anthony Watmough, rugby league player

Pop culture
 SBS television drama East West 101 was filmed in Auburn.

References

External links
 Auburn Council Website
 2001 Census Information

  [CC-By-SA]

 
Suburbs of Sydney
Turkish communities outside Turkey
Populated places established in 1793
Muslim enclaves